The Voice of Love (or variations) may refer to:

 The Voice of Love (film), a 1934 German film directed by Victor Janson
 The Voice of Love (Julee Cruise album), 1993
 Voice of Love, 1996 compilation album by American soul singer Diana Ross